Ras Al Khaimah (RAK) (historically Julfar) is the largest city and capital of the Emirate of Ras Al Khaimah, United Arab Emirates. It is the sixth-largest city in UAE after Dubai, Abu Dhabi, Sharjah, Al Ain and Ajman. The city is divided by a creek into two parts: old town in the west and Al Nakheel in the east.

Etymology
The name Ras Al Khaimah means "the headland of the tent". It is reported that the city gained its named after a tent was erected there to facilitate navigation.

History

The northern area of the city today known as Ras Al Khaimah was previously the location of the important Islamic era settlement and port of Julfar. Ras Al Khaimah has been the site of continuous human habitation for 7,000 years, one of the few places in the country and the world where this is the case.

Archaeological evidence has demonstrated that the settlement known as Julfar shifted location over time as harbour channels silted up. Excavations of a sizable tell, which revealed remnants of a Sassanid era fortification, indicate that early Julfar was located in the north of the present city of Ras Al Khaimah, not far from other sites of historical and archaeological interest such as the Pre-Islamic fort, 'Sheba's Palace' (Shimal Fort).

One of Ras Al Khaimah's most celebrated sons, Ibn Majid, was a hugely influential seaman, navigator and cartographer, and there is evidence in his writing that the town he came from was at that time known as Ras Al Khaimah, that town having eclipsed Julfar as the principal port and settlement of the Shimal coast.

In the early 18th century, the Qawasim (singular Al Qasimi) established themselves in Ras Al Khaimah and Sharjah on the Arabian Peninsula, growing to become a significant maritime force with holdings on both the Persian and Arabian coasts that frequently came into conflict with British flagged shipping.

In the aftermath of a series of attacks against shipping sailing under Omani flags and following 1809 monsoon season, the British mounted the Persian Gulf campaign of 1809 against Ras Al Khaimah, in which the Al Qasimi fleet was largely destroyed. The British operation continued to Lingeh on the Persian coast which was, like the Greater and Lesser Tunbs islands, administered by the Al Qasimi.

By the morning of 14 November, the military expedition was over and the British forces returned to their ships, having suffered light casualties of five killed and 34 wounded. Arab losses are unknown, but were probably significant, while the damage done to the Al Qasimi fleets was severe: a significant portion of their vessels had been destroyed.

Following the 1809 campaign, an 1815 arrangement was made between the British and the Al Qasimi. However, by 1819 it was clear the arrangement had broken down and so in November of that year, the British embarked on a second expedition against the Al Qasimi at Ras Al Khaimah, led by Major-General William Keir Grant.

The force gathered off the coast of Ras Al Khaimah on 25 and 26 November and, on 2 and 3 December, troops were landed south of the town and set up batteries of guns and mortars and, on 5 December, the town was bombarded from both land and sea for a period of four days, until, on 9 December, the fortress and town of Ras Al Khaimah were stormed and found to be practically deserted. On the fall of Ras Al Khaimah, three cruisers were sent to blockade Rams to the North and this, too was found to be deserted and its inhabitants retired to the 'impregnable' hill-top fort of Dhayah.

The British landed a force at Rams on 18 December, which fought its way inland through date plantations to Dhayah Fort on the 19th. There, 398 men and another 400 women and children held out, without sanitation, water or effective cover from the sun, for three days under heavy fire from mortars and 12-pound cannon.

The two 24-pound cannon from HMS Liverpool which had been used to bombard Ras Al Khaimah from the landward side were once again pressed into use and dragged across the plain from Rams, a journey of some four miles. Each of the guns weighed over 2 tonnes. After enduring two hours of sustained fire from the big guns, which breached the fort's walls, the last of the Al Qasimi surrendered at 10.30 on the morning of 22 December.

In January 1820, the British imposed the General Maritime Treaty of 1820 signed by Sheikh Sultan Bin Saqr Al Qasimi of Sharjah who was reinstated by the British in Ras Al Khaimah after the deposition of Hassan bin Rahma Al Qasimi. The treaty stipulated the end of piracy and slavery, and laid the foundation for the British protectorate over the Trucial States that lasted until December 1971.

A British protectorate from this point forward, as one of the Trucial States, in 1869, Ras Al Khaimah became fully independent from neighbouring Sharjah. From September 1900 to 7 July 1921, it was re-incorporated into Sharjah; the last governor became its next independent ruler.

The last of the Trucial States to join the newly independent United Arab Emirates, on 10 February 1972, Ras Al Khaimah, under the leadership of Sheikh Saqr bin Mohammad Al Qasimi, joined the United Arab Emirates following the Iranian seizure of Abu Musa and the Greater and Lesser Tunbs.

Population
The population of the city is around 115,949 (2021) and it is the largest city in the Emirate of Ras Al Khaimah. It is the 6th most populous city in the UAE.

Areas
 Sidroh
 Al Rams
 Khuzam
 Digdaga
 Al Seih
 Al Dhait North
 Al Dhait South
 Al Mamourah
 Al Nakheel
 Al Qurm
 Al Qusaidat

Education
Other than Arabic government-funded schools, the city is home to Ras Al Khaimah Academy and Wellspring School, and other Indian schools. It also has Higher Colleges of Technology campus, Ras Al Khaimah Medical and Health Sciences University, American University of Ras Al Khaimah and many other colleges.

Transportation
Ras Al Khaimah International Airport serves the Emirate of Ras Al Khaimah.

Economy
The city of Ras Al Khaimah is home to the Ras Al Khaimah Economic Zone (RAKEZ) that helps connect investors and international markets. It operates an online client portal called Portal 360. The zone services businesses ranging from freelancers to SMEs and start-ups across 50 industries. RAKEZ is divided into six dedicated zones:

 Al Ghail Industrial Zone  
 Al Hamra Industrial Zone  
 RAKEZ Academic Zone  
 Al Hulaila Industrial Zone  
 Al Nakheel Business Zone  
 Al Hamra Business Zone

Ceramics industry   
The city is the headquarters of RAK Ceramics, a global ceramics manufacturer. The company produces 123 million square meters of tiles and 5 million pieces of sanitaryware every year. It employs 12,000 employees and is listed on the Abu Dhabi Securities Exchange in the United Arab Emirates and on the Dhaka Stock Exchange in Bangladesh. Its annual turnover is estimated at $1 billion.

Pharmaceutical industry
Gulf Pharmaceutical Industries is a pharmaceutical manufacturer operating in the MENA region and headquartered in the city of Ras Al Khaimah. The company, also known under the name of Julphar, employs 5,000 people and distributes its products to 50 countries. It divides its activities between three units: Julphar Diabetes Solutions, General Medicines and Julphar Life. The company became a producers of raw ingredients for insulin in 2012.

Sports
The city is home to football teams Emirates Club and Ras Al Khaimah Club, which have both competed in the UAE Top Division.

References

External links
 

 
Cities in the United Arab Emirates
Populated coastal places in the United Arab Emirates
Populated places in the Emirate of Ras Al Khaimah